Shihhi Arabic (also known as Shehhi, Shihu, Shihuh, or Al-Shihuh) is a variety of Arabic spoken in the Musandam Governorate of Oman and Ras al Khaimah emirate of UAE. The Al Shehhi, Al Hebsi, Al Dhuhoori and Al Shemaili tribes speak it.

See also
 Varieties of Arabic
 Gulf Arabic

Notes

External links

Arabic languages
Arabs in Oman
Languages of Oman
Languages of the United Arab Emirates
Musandam Governorate
Mashriqi Arabic
Peninsular Arabic